The First Baptist Church in Greeley, Colorado is a historic Baptist church at Tenth Avenue and Eleventh Street, on the northwest corner. It was built in 1911 and added to the National Register of Historic Places in 1987.

It was designed by Denver architect T. Robert Wieger, who also designed the National Register listed Stanley Hotel in Estes Park.

See also
National Register of Historic Places listings in Weld County, Colorado

References

Baptist churches in Colorado
Churches on the National Register of Historic Places in Colorado
Churches completed in 1911
Churches in Weld County, Colorado
National Register of Historic Places in Weld County, Colorado